Mohammed Fardj (born 19 July 1998) is an Algerian freestyle wrestler. He is a bronze medalist at the African Games and a three-time medalist, including two gold medals, at the African Wrestling Championships.

Career 

He represented Algeria in the men's freestyle 97 kg event at the 2018 Mediterranean Games held in Tarragona, Catalonia, Spain. In 2019, he represented Algeria at the African Games held in Rabat, Morocco and he won one of the bronze medals in the men's freestyle 97 kg event. In the same year, he also competed in the 92 kg event at the 2019 World Wrestling Championships held in Nur-Sultan, Kazakhstan without winning a medal.

He qualified at the 2021 African & Oceania Wrestling Olympic Qualification Tournament to represent Algeria at the 2020 Summer Olympics in Tokyo, Japan. He was registered to compete in the men's 97 kg event but he did not compete.

He won the gold medal in his event at the 2022 African Wrestling Championships held in El Jadida, Morocco. He competed in the men's 97 kg event at the 2022 Mediterranean Games held in Oran, Algeria.

Major results

References

External links 
 

Living people
1998 births
Place of birth missing (living people)
Algerian male sport wrestlers
African Games bronze medalists for Algeria
African Games medalists in wrestling
Competitors at the 2019 African Games
Mediterranean Games competitors for Algeria
Competitors at the 2018 Mediterranean Games
Competitors at the 2022 Mediterranean Games
African Wrestling Championships medalists
21st-century Algerian people